Rotkvarija, also known as Žitni Trg, is an urban neighborhood of the city of Novi Sad, Serbia.

Borders
The southern border of Rotkvarija is Jevrejska ulica (Jewish Street), the south-eastern borders are Šafarikova ulica (Šafarik Street) and Ulica Jovana Subotića (Jovan Subotić Street), the north-eastern border is Kisačka ulica (Kisač Street), the northern border is Bulevar Jaše Tomića (Jaša Tomić Boulevard), and the western border is Bulevar Oslobođenja (Liberation Boulevard).

Neighbouring settlements
The neighbouring settlements are: Sajmište in the west, Banatić in the north-west, Salajka in the north-east, and Stari Grad in the south-east.

History
Its old name was Jovanovski Kraj. It was named after a church dedicated to Sveti Jovan (Saint Jovan) that existed in the area until 1921 (the church was built in 1700 and was the oldest church in Novi Sad. It was burned in the 1848/49 revolution, but was rebuilt in 1853. In 1921, the church was razed).

The current name, Rotkvarija, derived from the fact that inhabitants of the neighborhood in the past were engaged in radish production (radish is known as "rotkva" in Serbian, hence the name). The third name of the neighborhood, Žitni Trg ("the grain marketplace" in English), derived from the grain market that existed here in the past.

Features

Some of the important features of Rotkvarija are: Futoška pijaca (Futog Market), Reformer-Calvinist Church (built in 1865), and Slovak-Evangelist Church (built in 1886).

Literature
Milorad Grujić, Vodič kroz Novi Sad i okolinu, Novi Sad, 2004.
Jovan Mirosavljević, Brevijar ulica Novog Sada 1745-2001, Novi Sad, 2002.

See also
Neighborhoods of Novi Sad

External links
Detailed map of Novi Sad and Rotkvarija
Map of Novi Sad

Images

Novi Sad neighborhoods